Korea Aerospace Industries (KAI; Korean: 한국항공우주산업, Hanja: 韓國航空宇宙産業) is a South Korean aerospace and defense company. It was originally established as a joint venture of Samsung Aerospace, Daewoo Heavy Industries' aerospace division, and Hyundai Space and Aircraft Company (HYSA). During 1999, KAI became more independent of its founding members, acquiring their aerospace interests at the behest of the South Korean government following the financial troubles of these companies that had resulted from the 1997 Asian financial crisis.

KAI has developed various aerospace products, including the Korea Space Launch Vehicle(KSLV)-II and various satellites. It has been involved in the production of several foreign-designed aircraft via licensing arrangements, such as the MBB/Kawasaki BK 117, MBB Bo-105 KLH, and the KF-16. KAI has also developed and produced its own aircraft designs, including the KT-1 Woongbi and T-50 Golden Eagle training aircraft, the KC-100 Naraon general aviation aircraft, and the KUH-1 Surion utility helicopter. Both the company's headquarters and several key manufacturing facilities are located in Sacheon, South Gyeongsang Province.

Projects 
KAI was involved in the production of the first indigenously developed South Korean aircraft, the KT-1 Woongbi; it was developed under the KTX programme, which had been launched during 1988 on behalf of the Republic of Korea Air Force (RKAF) to develop an indigenously designed trainer aircraft. It was a joint effort between KAI and government body Agency for Defence Development (ADD); the latter was responsible for overseeing the project, while the former performed the detailed design work as well as the majority of manufacturing activity. During 2002, KAI revealed that they were working on the production of an upgraded and armed version of the KT-1, designated KO-1, which was intended to be used in the forward air control and counter-insurgency (COIN) roles. Development was conducted in cooperation with the Agency for Defence Development (ADD) and had been undertaken in response to an existing RKAF requirement for 20-40 aircraft.

During June 2006, KAI and Eurocopter won a  research and development contract for the Korea Helicopter Project - Korea Utility Helicopter (KHP-KUH) from the Defense Acquisition Program Administration (DAPA) to start the project. The development of the rotorcraft, the KUH-1 Surion, was funded 84% by the South Korean government and 16% by KAI and Eurocopter. At the time, it was the biggest South Korean defense contract to be issued to a non-American defense company. In January 2011, Eurocopter and KAI established a joint venture, KAI-EC, for the purposes of marketing the Surion and handling export sales; at the time, it was envisioned that 250-300 units would be sold worldwide by 2021. In December 2012, deliveries of the first Surion model formally commenced. In February 2013, low temperature testing in Alaska, United States, was completed, leading to development of the KUH-1 Surion being formally recognized as completed in the following month. The Surion served as the basis for a navalised derivative, the Korean Naval Helicopter (KNH); by 2011, the KNH had entered into the development stage; work was being performed on the project by a partnership between KAI, Eurocopter, and Elbit Systems. In January 2016, following completion of development work on the amphibious variant of the Surion, it was announced that this variant had been cleared to enter production later that year.

Keen to beak into the civilian market and reduce its reliance on government projects, KAI formally launched development of the KC-100 Naraon general aviation aircraft during 2008. While largely conventional in its basic configuration, use of composite materials and the adoption of cutting-edge technologies were intended to allow it to be 10% more fuel efficient than existing rivals. The flight test programme was completed successfully on 22 March 2013, the aircraft's type certificate being received shortly thereafter. During the 2010s, KAI commenced development of a military trainer variant, designated KT-100, for the South Korean Air Force (SKAF); the first aircraft of this model first flew during 2015. Once delivered, the KT-100 fleet will replace the 20 Ilyushin Il-103 aircraft currently stationed at the SKAF's academy for training student pilots.

In 2008, KAI studied a 60-seat KRJ regional jet: a T-tail, four-abreast aircraft able to be stretched to 100 seats, similar to the Bombardier CRJ. Two years later, the company was reportedly still considering launching a 90-seat turboprop; it was then believed that an announcement could occur as early as 2011. In October 2012, a joint development deal between Bombardier Aerospace and a government-led South Korean consortium was revealed, to develop a 90-seater turboprop regional airliner, targeting a 2019 launch date. The consortium would include both KAI and Korean Air Lines. Despite this announcement, KAI continued to study the prospective 90-seat regional airliner for several more years.

During 2019, it was announced that KAI is to manufacture the wings of the Gulfstream G280 business jet on behalf of Israeli manufacturer IAI, taking over from the Triumph Group; the company is contracted 300 sets until 2030 for $529 million, at a new factory at Gosung, 30 km (20 mi) from its Sacheon main plant. In the long term, the company reportedly has ambitions to license-produce a civil aircraft from 2023; it also seeks to develop a 50-70 seat regional airliner, powered either by turboprop or turbofan engines. The latter is set to complete exploratory development by 2022; a 2030 introduction date has been set.

Products 
Licensed production
 MBB/Kawasaki BK 117: Hyundai Space and Aircraft Company in 1989 assembled a BK-117.
 MBB Bo-105 KLH (1989): Daewoo Heavy Industries (aerospace division) license-produced combat version of CBS-5.
 KF-16, (1991): Samsung Aerospace produced 140 F-16 C/D Block 52 fighters under license from Lockheed Martin in the 1990s.
 Airbus H155: KAI LCA and LAH (Light Civil Helicopter and Light Armed Helikopter)

Upgrade and Modification
 P-3CK
 Lockheed C-130 Hercules
 Westland Lynx
 Boeing 737 AEW&C

Fixed-wing aircraft
 KAI KT-1 Woongbi (2000)
 KAI T-50 Golden Eagle (2005)
 KAI KC-100 Naraon (2011) – four-seat, single piston engine general aviation aircraft
 KAI KT-100 (2015) - military piston-engined basic trainer
 KAI KF-21 Boramae (2022) - advanced multirole fighter
 KAI MC-X (research and development) - advanced military transport aircraft to be developed with the United Arab Emirates

Helicopter
 KAI KUH-1 Surion (2013)

Unmanned aerial vehicles
 KAI RQ-101 Songgolmae (2001): internationally as the Night Intruder 300

Co-development
 Bell 427 helicopter, designed and manufactured by Bell Helicopter and Samsung Aerospace Industries.
 Bell 429 helicopter, designed and manufactured by Bell Helicopter and Samsung Aerospace Industries.

Satellites
 Korean Multipurpose Satellites No. 1, 2, 3 and 5

Launch vehicle
 Korea Space Launch Vehicle(KSLV)-II: The KSLV-II has been designed to generate a combined thrust of 300 tons by tying in parallel four 75 ton-class liquid fuel-powered engines. KSLV 2 is the launcher earmarked for the spacecraft that South Korea proposes to send to the moon by 2022. A lunar lander is supposed to follow in 2030.

Future projects
 KAI Midsize Turboprop Passenger Plane - on joint development of a 90-seat turboprop plane by 2019.
 KAI UAV-II - As a developer of the ROK Army's corps level reconnaissance UAVs.

References

External links 

 Korea Aerospace Industries website
 Global Security on KAI

Defence companies of South Korea
Aerospace companies of South Korea
Aircraft manufacturers of South Korea
Helicopter manufacturers
Science and technology in South Korea